This is a list of Danish film directors. It includes some foreign-born film directors who have worked in Denmark.

A
Asbjørn Andersen
Nikolaj Arcel
Morten Arnfred
Natasha Arthy
Bille August
Gabriel Axel

B
 Erik Balling
 Poul Bang
 Aske Bang
 Susanne Bier
 Jens Bjerre
 August Blom
 Christoffer Boe
 Christian Holten Bonke

C
Henning Carlsen
Benjamin Christensen
Pernille Fischer Christensen
Erik Clausen

D
Carl Theodor Dreyer

E
Peter Elfelt
Jonas Elmer
Franz Ernst

F
Per Fly
Peter Schønau Fog
Gert Fredholm
Grete Frische

G
Emanuel Gregers
Lene Grønlykke
Sven Grønlykke
Peer Guldbrandsen

H
Rumle Hammerich
Jannik Hastrup
Astrid Henning-Jensen
Bjarne Henning-Jensen
Finn Henriksen
Annelise Hovmand
Allan Hyde

I
Bodil Ipsen
Jon Iversen

J
Johan Jacobsen
Anders Thomas Jensen
Tomas Villum Jensen
Hella Joof

K
Palle Kjærulff-Schmidt
Søren Kragh-Jacobsen
Hans Kristensen

L
Birger Larsen
Viggo Larsen
Lau Lauritzen
Jørgen Leth
Lisbeth Lynghøft

M
Ole Christian Madsen
Nils Malmros
Sven Methling
Svend Methling
Ib Mossin
Flemming Quist Møller

N
Jesper W. Nielsen

O
Alice O'Fredericks
Annette K. Olesen
Lasse Spang Olsen
Niels Arden Oplev
Katrin Ottarsdóttir (Faroe Islands)

P
John Price

R
Jonas Poher Rasmussen
Annelise Reenberg
Anders Refn
Nicolas Winding Refn
Jytte Rex
Kaspar Rostrup

S
Åke Sandgren
Lone Scherfig
George Schnéevoigt
Gunnar Sommerfeldt

T
Knud Leif Thomsen

V
Knud Vesterskov
Thomas Vinterberg
Lars von Trier

W
Arne Weel

Sources
The original version of this article was copied from this version of the article :da:Danske filminstruktører in the Danish-language Wikipedia.

See also
Cinema of Denmark

Film directors

Lists of film directors by nationality